Tomas District is one of thirty-three districts of the Yauyos Province in Peru.

The district of Tomas was official founded on October 16, 1933.  Placed just above the Canyon of Uchco and surrounded by three majestic mountains (Tunshupalpa, Uman Huarco and La Libertad) Tomas is one of the highest districts within the province of Yauyos.  It is located on the border of the Junin department and is within the boundaries of the Nor Yauyos-Cochas Landscape Reserve (Reserva Paisajistica Nor Yauyos Cochas). The community of Tomas has about 600 alpacas, a herd of 30 vicugnas, among other Andean Camelids. 

Although difficult to get to, the community of Tomas offers a hotel and in-home hospitality services, three in home restaurants, and a variety of tourist sites to visit.  Some of the tourist highlights include the Caida de Angel (Angel Falls), the Camino de Ayacoto (Ayacoto trail) which is a 2-3 hour route that passes through 2 sets of pre-Inca ruins, visiting the Unidad de Produccion de Alpacas Contadera (Andean Alpaca Farm), and hikes up the Sinwa River with the locals. If you can handle the altitude (about 11,500 feet above sea level) and are up for visiting real, untouched rural Peru, the visit is well worth the effort.

Geography 
Other mountains are listed below:

See also 
 Qiwllaqucha
 Ñawinpukyu

References